William Buford (born January 10, 1990) is an American professional basketball player for s.Oliver Würzburg of the Basketball Bundesliga.

High school career
As a junior at Libbey High School, Buford averaged 28 points and 12 rebounds per game, earning All-State honors. During his senior season, Buford averaged 23 points and 11 rebounds per game. Buford was also named Ohio Mr. Basketball. Buford also participated in the McDonald's All-American Game and the Jordan Brand Classic.

College career

Freshman season
In Buford's freshman season at Ohio State, he averaged 11.3 points and 3.7 rebounds per game. For the week of January 19, Buford was named the Big Ten Player of the Week, after averaging 17 points and 6 rebounds per game in two Ohio State wins. He was also named the Big Ten Freshman of the Year and was an Honorable Mention All-Big Ten selection.

Sophomore season
As a sophomore, Buford averaged 14.4 points and 5.7 rebounds per game. He was also a Third Team All Big-Ten selection.

Junior season
In his junior season at Ohio State, Buford averaged 14.4 points and 3.9 rebounds per game. He was also a Second Team All Big-Ten selection.

Senior season
Before his senior season at Ohio State, Buford was a preseason All Big-Ten selection, as well as a Top-50 Naismith and Wooden Award watch. In his senior season, Buford averaged 14.5 points and 4.9 rebounds per game. Following the season, Buford was named to the All Big-Ten Second Team. He was also named a Lowe's Senior Class Award finalist.

Professional career
After going undrafted in the 2012 NBA draft, Buford joined the Minnesota Timberwolves for their pre-Summer League mini-camp and the Timberwolves' Las Vegas Summer League team. In two games with the Timberwolves, Buford recorded a total of five rebounds and two assists.

In August 2012, he signed his first professional contract with Blu:sens Monbús of Spain.

Buford joined the Utah Jazz for the 2013 NBA Summer League. In November 2013, he was acquired by the Santa Cruz Warriors. On March 8, 2014, he was traded to Canton Charge.

On November 2, 2014, Buford was reacquired by the Canton Charge. He was waived by Canton on December 17, 2014. On January 9, 2015, he was acquired by the Texas Legends.

On July 18, 2015, he signed with the Tigers Tübingen of the Basketball Bundesliga.

On June 10, 2016, he signed with Limoges CSP of the LNB Pro A.

On August 23, 2019, he has signed with Virtus Roma of the Italian Lega Basket Serie A (LBA). 

On October 5, 2020, he has signed with Darüşşafaka of the Basketball Super League.

On August 6, 2021, Buford signed with s.Oliver Würzburg of the Basketball Bundesliga.

See also
 The Basketball Tournament 2019, which named Buford as its MVP

References

External links
Profile at Eurobasket.com

1990 births
Living people
American expatriate basketball people in France
American expatriate basketball people in Germany
American expatriate basketball people in Greece
American expatriate basketball people in Italy
American expatriate basketball people in Spain
American expatriate basketball people in Turkey
American men's basketball players
Basketball players from Ohio
BCM Gravelines players
BG Göttingen players
Canton Charge players
Darüşşafaka Basketbol players
Lavrio B.C. players
Lega Basket Serie A players
Liga ACB players
Limoges CSP players
McDonald's High School All-Americans
Obradoiro CAB players
Ohio State Buckeyes men's basketball players
Pallacanestro Virtus Roma players
Parade High School All-Americans (boys' basketball)
S.Oliver Würzburg players
Santa Cruz Warriors players
Shooting guards
Sportspeople from Toledo, Ohio
Texas Legends players
Tigers Tübingen players